The Man Next Door is a 1923 American silent comedy-drama film directed by Victor Schertzinger and starring David Torrence, Frank Sheridan, and James W. Morrison.

Cast
 David Torrence as Colonel Wright 
 Frank Sheridan as Curley 
 James W. Morrison as Jimmy 
 Alice Calhoun as Bonnie Bell 
 John Steppling as David Wisner 
 Adele Farrington as Mrs. Wisner 
 Mary Culver as Catherine Kimberly 
 Bruce Boteler as Tom Kimberly

References

Bibliography
 James Robert Parish & Michael R. Pitts. Film Directors: a Guide to their American Films. Scarecrow Press, 1974.

External links

1923 films
1923 comedy-drama films
American silent feature films
Films directed by Victor Schertzinger
American black-and-white films
Vitagraph Studios films
1920s English-language films
1920s American films
Silent American comedy-drama films